M. Lee McClenny (born 1961) is an American diplomat who served as the United States Ambassador to Paraguay from 2018 to 2020.

Education
McClenny received his Bachelor of Arts degree from the University of Washington in Seattle.

Career
McClenny is a career member of the Senior Foreign Service. He has been working for the State Department since 1994 and held various positions including Chargé d'affaires at the U.S. Embasssy in Caracas, Venezuela.

United States Ambassador to Paraguay
On October 30, 2017, President Trump nominated McClenny to be the United States Ambassador to Paraguay. On December 21, 2017, the Senate confirmed his nomination by voice vote. He was sworn in on February 20, 2018. He left office on September 16, 2020.

Personal life
McClenny speaks Spanish, French, and some Serbo-Croatian and Russian.

See also

List of ambassadors appointed by Donald Trump

References 

Living people
Ambassadors of the United States to Paraguay
United States Foreign Service personnel
University of Washington alumni
1961 births
21st-century American diplomats